Paul Upfield is an Australian former professional rugby league footballer who played in the 1980s and 1990s. He played for Illawarra, St. George  and Balmain in the NSWRL competition.

Playing career
An Illawarra junior, Upfield made his first grade debut in round 7 of the 1984 NSWRL season against Western Suburbs at Lidcombe Oval. Upfield scored a try on debut during a 13–10 loss. In 1988, Upfield was selected to represent NSW Country in the annual City vs Country Origin match. Upfield departed Illawarra at the end of 1988 having played 80 matches.

In 1989, Upfield joined St. George but only made five appearances for the first grade team before another transfer to Balmain where he played two seasons. Following his departure from Balmain, he played for Wagga Kangaroos and the Nowra Warriors. In 1994 he captain-coached Bathurst to a Group 10 premiership before returning to the Illawarra competition as a representative captain-coach.

References

St. George Dragons players
Illawarra Steelers players
Balmain Tigers players
Australian rugby league players
Rugby league wingers
1964 births
Living people
Country New South Wales rugby league team players